Aglaia Kremezi (Αγλαΐα Κρεμέζη) is a Greek food writer and journalist, often considered "one of Greece's foremost cooking authorities".

She lives on the island of Kea, Greece, where she runs a cooking school.

Bibliography
 The Mediterranean Pantry: Creating and Using Condiments and Seasonings, 1994
 Mediterranean Hot: Spicy Recipes from Southern Italy, Greece, Turkey and North Africa, 1996
 The Foods of Greece, 1999
 The Foods of the Greek Islands: Cooking and Culture at the Crossroads of the Mediterranean, 2000

Notes

External links
 Aglaia's table, official Web site

Living people
Greek food writers
Greek women journalists
People from Kea (island)
Women food writers
Women cookbook writers
Year of birth missing (living people)